Paramordella is a genus of beetles in the family Mordellidae, containing the following species:

 Paramordella brevesetosa Pic, 1936
 Paramordella unimaculata (Pic, 1931)

References

Mordellidae